Eduardo Azevedo (born September 21, 1982 in São Paulo) is a race car driver. He was the 2001 Brazilian Formula Junior champion and the 2002 South American Formula Three Class-B champion. He raced in Brazilian Formula Renault in 2003.

External links

1982 births
Living people
Brazilian racing drivers
Brazilian Formula Renault 2.0 drivers
Formula 3 Sudamericana drivers
Racing drivers from São Paulo
21st-century Brazilian people

24H Series drivers